Nonie Darwish (born Nahid Darwish, 1949) is an Egyptian-American writer, founder of Arabs for Israel movement, and is Director of Former Muslims United. Darwish is an outspoken critic of Islam. The Southern Poverty Law Center has described her as an anti-Arab and anti-Muslim activist.

Born in Egypt, Darwish is the daughter of an Egyptian Army lieutenant general, who was called a "shahid" by the Egyptian president Gamal Abdel Nasser, after being killed in a targeted killing by the Israel Defense Forces in 1956. Darwish blames "the Middle Eastern Islamic culture and the propaganda of hatred taught to children from birth" for his death.  In 1978, she moved with her husband to the United States, and converted to Christianity there. In the aftermath of the 11 September 2001 attacks, she has written on Islam-related topics.  She is the author of four books: Now They Call Me Infidel: Why I Renounced Jihad for America, Israel, and the War on Terror, Cruel and Usual Punishment: The Terrifying Global Implications of Islamic Law, The Devil We Don't Know: The Dark Side of Revolutions in the Middle East, and Wholly Different: Why I Chose Biblical Values Over Islamic Values.

Biography
Nonie Darwish was born in 1949 in Cairo, Egypt. Her father, Colonel Mustafa Hafez, was paternally of Turkish ancestry. In the 1950s her Egyptian family moved to Gaza when her father was sent by president Gamal Abdel Nasser to serve as commander of the Egyptian Army Intelligence in Gaza, which was under supervision of Egypt. Hafez founded the fedayeen who launched raids across Israel's southern border, that between 1951 and 1956, killed many Israelis, the majority civilians.  In July 1956 when Nonie was six years old, her father was killed by a mail bomb in an operation by the Israeli Defense Forces. The assassination was a response to Fedayeen's attacks, making Darwish's father a shahid. The assassination was planned by Yehoshafat Harkabi. During his speech announcing the nationalization of the Suez Canal, Nasser vowed that all of Egypt would take revenge for Hafez's death. Darwish claims that Nasser asked her and her siblings, "Which one of you will avenge your father's death by killing Jews?"

Darwish was the founder of an organisation called "Former Muslims United", which has been described as a "fringe group". It was a project of American Freedom Defense Initiative, run by anti-Muslim activist Pamela Geller.

Darwish is a strong supporter of Israel, and has founded the group Arabs for Israel. She says, "Just because I am pro- Israel does not mean I am anti- Arab, its just that my culture is in desperate need for reformation which must come from within".

Views on Islam

Darwish believes Islam is an authoritarian ideology that is attempting to impose on the world the norms of seventh-century culture of the Arabian Peninsula. She writes that Islam is a "sinister force" that must be resisted and contained. She remarks that it is hard to "comprehend that an entire religion and its culture believes God orders the killing of unbelievers." She claims that Islam and Sharia form a retrograde ideology that adds greatly to the world's stock of misery.

She claims the Qur'an is a text that is "violent, incendiary, and disrespectful" and says that brutalization of women, the persecution of homosexuals, honor killings, the beheading of apostates and the stoning of adulterers come directly out of Islamic texts.

In her book Now They Call Me Infidel, Darwish calls upon America to "get tougher", impose stricter immigration laws especially on Muslim and Arab immigrants, endorse assimilation, and stop "multiculturalism and cultural relativism". She has also called for non-Muslim Americans to be wary of interfaith marriages particularly those where Muslims marry Jewish or Christian women.

She has participated in several counter-jihad conferences and rallies organized by Stop Islamization of America and Stop Islamization of Nations.

Reception 
Critics have accused Darwish of operating as part of a "shariah scare industry". According to professor Deepa Kumar, Nonie Darwish has played a role in legitimizing "racist attacks on Muslims and Arabs".

In a 2008 article, Max Blumenthal wrote that Darwish has described Barack Obama as a "political muslim" and stated that Islam "was not a true religion". At a 2011 hearing on terrorism in New York Darwish suggested that “The education of Arab children is to make killing of certain groups of people not only good, it’s holy,” and was accused by then New York State Senator Eric Adams of “bringing hate and poison". In 2012, the Southern Poverty Law Center described Darwish as being part of a group of "rabid Islamophobes who promote an array of anti-Muslim conspiracy theories and propaganda". In 2017 the SPLC said Darwish had "made insidious claims including saying Linda Sarsour “wants” to give up her children “to die killing Jews” and that, “she wants to bring Sharia to America.”". 

Professor Sahar Aziz describes Darwish as someone who converted out of Islam and then allied with anti-Muslim far-right organizations. She writes that while Darwish's views may be sincerely held, she is exploited by Islamophobic right wing political groups.

In a 2018 journal article, Steven Fink accused Darwish of using her “ex-Muslim insider” status to give herself credibility, as well criticising her for stating that “To be a Muslim is to take an oath of submission to the Sharia state, and that oath prevents you from claiming the human rights that are the priority of any true religion. That is why Islam’s greatest enemies are Christianity and Judaism and nations that are founded on their values” and suggesting Muslims “are incapable of feeling compassion toward non-Muslims. Acknowledging compassion to non-Muslim oppressed minorities is grounds for apostasy. A Muslim must stay hardened and unyielding” with Fink writing: "Worlds apart from acknowledging Muslim Americans as compatriots or fellow human beings, Darwish’s shariah scare industry portrayal transforms Muslims into anti-American automatons."

Published works
 
 
 
 
Darwish denies that she is the author of an essay entitled "Joys of Muslim Women" attributed to her in a chain email which began to circulate on the internet in 2009.

See also

Muslim supporters of Israel

References

External links
 
 
 

1949 births
Living people
21st-century American writers
21st-century American women writers
21st-century Egyptian women writers
21st-century Egyptian writers
American Christian Zionists
American Protestants
Egyptian Zionists
American people of Egyptian descent
Converts to Protestantism from Islam
Former Muslim critics of Islam
Egyptian Protestants
Egyptian Christians
American Christians
Egyptian emigrants to the United States
American former Muslims
Egyptian former Muslims
Critics of multiculturalism
American critics of Islam
Counter-jihad activists